Carthage in Flames is a 1960 Italian historical drama film directed by Carmine Gallone and starring Pierre Brasseur, José Suárez, Daniel Gélin and Anne Heywood. It was shot at the Cinecittà Studios in Rome. The film's sets were designed by the art director Guido Fiorini. It is based on the 1908 novel of the same title by Emilio Salgari.

Synopsis
The film depicts the last of the Punic Wars between the Roman Republic and Carthage.

Cast
 Pierre Brasseur as Sidone 
 Daniel Gélin as Phegor 
 Anne Heywood as Fulvia 
 Aldo Silvani as Hermon 
 Ilaria Occhini as Ophir 
 Paolo Stoppa as Astarito 
 José Suárez as Hiram 
 Terence Hill as Tsour 
 Gianrico Tedeschi as Eleo 
 Edith Peters as Sarepta 
 Cesare Fantoni as Assian 
 Erno Crisa as Asdrubak 
 Antonio Wisemané as Polacco
 Nicolini Roberto as Cesare

Production
Carthage in Flames was among the most expensive epic adventure films produced in Italy during the 1960s.

Bibliography

References

External links
 

1960 films
Italian epic films
French epic films
Peplum films
1960s Italian-language films
Films based on works by Emilio Salgari
Films directed by Carmine Gallone
Films scored by Mario Nascimbene
Films set in Carthage
Third Punic War films
Lux Film films
Films shot at Cinecittà Studios
Columbia Pictures films
Sword and sandal films
Italian fantasy films
1960s Italian films
1960s French films